Highway 13 is an expressway in southern Israel. It is 12 km long. It begins in the north at Tzihor junction with Highway 40, and ends in the south at Menuha junction with Highway 90. Thus, it connects between Highway 40, which runs north to Mizpe Ramon and Beersheba via the central Negev, and Highway 90, which traverses the Arava region on Israel's eastern border.

See also 
 List of highways in Israel

13